Jo Ann Prentice (born February 9, 1933) is an American professional golfer who played on the LPGA Tour.

Prentice was born in Birmingham, Alabama. She turned professional in 1956.

Prentice joined the LPGA tour in 1957 and won six times between 1965 and 1974.

Prentice was elected to the Alabama Sports Hall of Fame in 1991, and is one of only eight golfers in it.

Amateur wins
this list is incomplete
1954 Alabama Women's Amateur

Professional wins

LPGA Tour wins (6)

Note: Prentice won the Colgate-Dinah Shore Winner's Circle (now known as the Kraft Nabisco Championship) before it became a major championship.

LPGA Tour playoff record (2–1)

References

External links

American female golfers
LPGA Tour golfers
Golfers from Birmingham, Alabama
1933 births
Living people
21st-century American women